Scholtzia laxiflora is a shrub species in the family Myrtaceae that is endemic to Western Australia.

It blooms between April and December producing pink-white flowers.

It is found on sand plains, winter wet flats and hillslopes along the west coast in the Mid West and Wheatbelt regions of Western Australia between Northhampton and Dandaragan where it grows in sand to clay soils over laterite or limestone.

References

laxiflora
Plants described in 1867